Sønderup is a village in central Himmerland.  It is located in Sønderup parish: 10 kilometers east of Aars, five kilometers south of Suldrup, and three kilometers north of Haverslev. The village is located in the Nordjylland Region and belongs to Rebild Municipality.

As of 2017, the village had 219 inhabitants (2017).

The village
Sønderup has a meeting house, where the city's associations have historically held a wide variety of events. Near Sønderup lies the partially protected Sønderup Å. Other local attractions include Rold Skov; Rebild National Park; Thingbæk limestone mines; and Rævemosen, where the Gundestrup cauldron was found.

Sønderup church
The village's church, Sønderup Church (Danish: Sønderup kirke), was built in the 13th century. 

A porch was added to the church in the late 1800s.  In 1840, the church's old bell was cast.  The tower was remodeled several times, including in 1867.  During its last renovation, builders created its current pyramid spire.  

"The Danish Churches" indicates without reservation that the church's clock is molded. In 2010, Sønderup Church received a new clock. 

Sønderup shares a priest with Suldrup.

References 

Villages in Denmark
Himmerland